The 2010 Ford 400 was a NASCAR Sprint Cup Series stock car race that was held on November 21, 2010 at Homestead Miami Speedway in Homestead, Florida. The 267 lap race was the thirty-sixth in the 2010 NASCAR Sprint Cup Series, as well as the final race in the ten-race Chase for the Sprint Cup, which ends the season. The race was won by Carl Edwards for the Roush Fenway Racing team. Jimmie Johnson finished second, and Kevin Harvick clinched third.

Pole position driver Kasey Kahne maintained his lead on the first lap of the race. Edwards started in the second position on the grid, and became the leader of the race on the fourth lap. Shortly after a restart on lap 22, championship leader Denny Hamlin spun sideways, resulting with damage to his splitter. Martin Truex Jr. took the lead on lap 73, but after the final pit stops Edwards was first. He maintained the lead to win the race, having led it for 192 laps.

A total of 67,000 people attended the race, while 5.605 million watched it on television. There were ten cautions in the race, as well as twenty-five lead changes among nine different drivers. Edwards' victory was his second win in the 2010 season, with the first coming the previous week at the Kobalt Tools 500. Jimmie Johnson won the Drivers' Championship, 39 points ahead of Denny Hamlin. Johnson's team owner Rick Hendrick won the Owners' Championship. Chevrolet won the Manufacturer Championship with 261 points, 44 points ahead of Toyota.

Report

Background 

Homestead Miami Speedway is one of ten intermediate tracks to hold NASCAR races; the others are Atlanta Motor Speedway, Kansas Speedway, Chicagoland Speedway, Darlington Raceway, Texas Motor Speedway, New Hampshire Motor Speedway, Kentucky Speedway, Las Vegas Motor Speedway, and Charlotte Motor Speedway. The track's turns are banked from 18 to 20 degrees, while the front stretch, the location of the finish line, is banked at three degrees. The back stretch, opposite of the front, also has a three degree banking. The racetrack has seats for 65,000 spectators.

Heading into the final race of the season, Toyota driver Denny Hamlin was leading the Drivers' Championship with 6,462 points; Chevrolet driver Jimmie Johnson was second with 6,447 points, 15 points behind Hamlin. A maximum of 195 points were available for the final race. Behind Hamlin and Johnson in the Drivers' Championship, Kevin Harvick was third with 6,416 points in a Chevrolet, and Carl Edwards was fourth with 6,198 points. Chevrolet had already secured the Manufacturer's Championship, and entered the race on 255 points, 42 points ahead of Toyota on 213 points, with a maximum of nine points available at the Ford 400. Hamlin was the race's defending winner, after his victory at the 2009 race.

Practice and qualifying 
Three practice sessions were held before the race; the first on Friday, which lasted 90 minutes. The second and third were both on Saturday afternoon. The first Saturday practice lasted 45 minutes, while the second lasted 60. Edwards was quickest with a time of 30.710 seconds in the first session, 0.134 seconds faster than Kyle Busch. Johnson was just off Busch's pace, followed by Matt Kenseth, Jamie McMurray, and Jeff Gordon. Kasey Kahne was seventh, still within a second of Edwards's time.

Forty-five cars were entered for qualifying, but only forty-three could qualify for the race because of NASCAR's qualifying procedure. Kahne clinched the 20th pole position of his career, with a time of 30.525 seconds. He was joined on the front row of the grid by Edwards. McMurray qualified third, Bill Elliott took fourth, and A. J. Allmendinger started fifth. Johnson, David Reutimann, Mark Martin, David Ragan and Regan Smith rounded out the top ten. Hamlin only managed 37th, having getting close to the wall. The two drivers that failed to qualify for the race were Patrick Carpentier, and Michael McDowell. Once the qualifying session completed, Kahne commented, "That was the best qualifying run by far since I joined Red Bull. I look forward to Sunday’s race. It’s going to be exciting being up front now, being in the mix with Denny [Hamlin], Kevin [Harvick] and Jimmie [Johnson]. They’re all going to be fast throughout the race. I’m just glad we are so far. Hopefully we can stick with it tomorrow, have a good practice and be competitive in the mix on Sunday."

In the second practice session, Busch was fastest with a time of 31.425 seconds, less than five-hundredths of a second quicker than second-placed Jeff Burton. Gordon took third place, ahead of Greg Biffle, Martin and Hamlin. Johnson only managed 11th place.
Harvick was only quick enough for 19th position. In the third and final practice, Burton was quickest with a time of 31.850 seconds. Kahne followed in second, ahead of Martin Truex Jr. and Hamlin. Jamie McMurray was fifth quickest, with a time of 31.916 seconds. Edwards, Gordon, Ragan, Biffle, and Aric Almirola rounded out the first ten positions. Johnson, who was eleventh in the second session, could only manage 22nd. Following the third practice session, Harvick stated, "We didn't put up a fast lap but it never slows down. I'm really excited." Afterward, Johnson commented "We struggled a little bit maybe in the first practice. But I found a good direction and started making some good gains there at the end. I feel really good about our car. It's very comfortable. I can run the top, run the bottom. I think we're in good shape." "I think we've got the balance real close," Johnson continued. "My motor's running great. Maybe some overall grip but I think there I'm one of 43 guys that are saying that. This hot sun out here [is making] the track awful slick."

Race 
The race, the last in the season, began at 1:00 p.m. EST and was televised live in the United States on ESPN. Tim Griffin began pre-race ceremonies, by giving the invocation. Next, Bret Michaels along with Miami native Nanette Melina, performed the national anthem, and gave the command for drivers to start their engines. During the pace laps, Sam Hornish had to move to the rear of the grid because of changing to his backup car.

Kasey Kahne retained his pole position lead into the first corner, followed by Carl Edwards, who started second. On the following two laps, Jimmie Johnson took over the fourth position. On the fourth lap, Edwards passed Kahne for the first position. After starting from 37th, Denny Hamlin had moved to 27th by lap six. Eleventh-placed qualifier Jeff Gordon joined teammate Johnson in the top ten four laps later. Johnson passed A. J. Allmendinger on lap 12 to claim the third position, as David Reutimann and Kurt Busch collided into the wall. Five laps later, the first caution was given after Reutimann collided into the wall again. Most of the front runners made pit stops, except for J. J. Yeley, who didn't pit until the following lap. At the lap 22 restart, Edwards was first, ahead of Kahne, Allmendinger, and Johnson. Hamlin turned sideways and drove through the grass in the infield, prompting the second caution on the following lap. Hamlin only sustained minor damage to his splitter. Edwards remained the leader during the restart, while Allmendinger took over second from Kahne.

After starting 28th, Kevin Harvick had advanced to the tenth position by lap 28. Two laps later, Greg Biffle said on his team radio that he could smell smoke in his race car, which his team responded that it was probably a tire rubbing against the car. During lap 34, Martin Truex Jr. moved to seventh, having started 25th on the grid. Four laps later, Hamlin had moved to the 22nd position after his earlier accident. On the 41st lap, Truex Jr. moved past Johnson to claim the fourth position, while Hamlin continued to move toward the front runners. Edwards had over a one-second lead over the second position by lap 46. On the following lap, Hamlin took over the 18th position. After 50 laps, only 38 cars remained on the same lap as the leader. Edwards continued to expand his lead from 1.33 to 1.6 seconds in only five laps. On lap 54, Edwards was the leader, ahead of Allmendinger, Kahne, Truex, and Johnson.

Matt Kenseth took over the tenth position on lap 58. On lap 66, Hamlin made a pit stop, and Allmendinger did likewise two laps later. Juan Pablo Montoya and Kahne made their pit stops during the 69th lap. Edwards made a pit stop the following lap, giving the first position to Johnson. In turn, he made a pit stop on lap 71, handing the lead to Truex Jr. On the following lap, Harvick moved to ninth, as Hamlin took over 16th. By lap 77, Truex Jr. had a 1.2 second lead over Kahne. Seven laps later, Aric Almirola moved into the fifth position, Harvick was moving toward Johnson in seventh. By the 93rd lap, Truex Jr. increased his lead to 1.5 seconds. Five laps later, the third caution was given because of debris. Most of the front runners made pit stops during the caution, as Hamlin's team worked to repair his splitter. At the lap 102 restart, Truex Jr. was first, ahead of Edwards and Kahne in second and third. During the pit stops Johnson fell to 10th.

With assistance from Kyle Busch, Harvick took over fifth place on the following lap. Afterward, Edwards became the leader, after passing Truex Jr. On lap 105, Jamie McMurray passed Truex Jr. to move into second. David Ragan passed Kahne for the tenth position eleven laps later. Having led 86 of the first 124 laps, Edwards was finally passed on lap 125. Truex Jr. moved into first position, and by the same lap Almirola had slipped to tenth. Marcos Ambrose spun sideways on lap 135, causing the fourth caution of the race. The front runners subsequently made pit stops. At the lap 139 restart, Truex Jr. was the leader, ahead of Edwards, Harvick, and Johnson. One lap later, Montoya and Joey Logano collided, which resulted in Logano spinning sideways and sustaining major damage. At the lap 143 restart, Edwards was leader, after passing Truex Jr. before the previous caution. On the following lap, Johnson fell to fifth, as Harvick moved to third. During lap 145, Kyle Busch took third away from Harvick. Two laps later, Truex Jr. reclaimed the lead from Edwards.

On lap 152, Johnson fell to seventh, after McMurray passed him. On the following lap, Ryan Newman moved to the sixth position, as McMurray moved to fifth. By the 158th lap, Truex Jr. had a 1.2 second lead over Edwards. Six laps later, Kevin Conway spun sideways, prompting the sixth caution to be given. Most of the front runners made pit stop during the caution. At the lap 168 restart, Edwards was first, ahead of Kyle Busch, Harvick, and Truex Jr. Two laps later, Hamlin moved to ninth, after passing Almirola. On lap 175, Tony Stewart moved to sixth, after starting the race in 31st. Five laps later, Harvick moved into the third position, as Truex Jr. was moving toward Edwards. During the 183rd lap, Jeff Burton collided into the wall. On the following lap, Hamlin moved into sixth. On lap 186, the seventh caution was given because of debris. Most of the front runners made pit stops during the caution. Harvick became the leader under the caution, but was given a pit road speeding penalty, resulting in him starting in the rear of the grid. Truex Jr. led to the restart, as Edwards was second. The eighth caution was given two laps later because Dave Blaney collided into the wall. Harvick made pit stops during the caution, while the front runners stayed on the track. On lap 198, Edwards was first, ahead of Kenseth, Truex Jr. and Stewart.

Gordon's engine blew up on the 200th lap, prompting the ninth caution of the race. Edwards remained the leader on the restart, ahead of Kenseth, Kyle Busch, and Stewart. Harvick passed Hamlin for ninth place on lap 207, as Johnson and Kyle Busch were competing for the third position. Five laps later, Kyle Busch claimed third, as Johnson remained behind him. Johnson re-took the position on lap 213, after getting assistance from Stewart. Ten laps after the restart, Edwards had increased his lead to 1.29 seconds over second, as Brad Keselowski took the eighth position from Hamlin. During the 219th lap, Johnson moved into second, 2.58 seconds behind Edwards. Two laps later, Almirola and Biffle passed Hamlin, as Harvick moved to sixth. By the 230th lap, Edwards had over a two-second lead over Johnson. Nine laps later, Hamlin, Harvick, and Johnson made pit stops. During lap 240, Martin became the leader. On the following lap, Martin made a pit stop, giving the lead to Kahne.

The tenth caution was given on lap 243 when Harvick and Kyle Busch collided, resulting in Busch spinning sideways and colliding into the wall. His car was engulfed in flames, but he was pulled from the car by NASCAR personnel. At the lap 250 restart, Edwards was the leader, ahead of Johnson, Kenseth, and Harvick. On the following lap, Harvick passed Kenseth for third, as Hamlin fell to 21st. By lap 254, Edwards had less than a one-second lead over Johnson, while Harvick was 2.59 seconds behind. Edwards continued to increase his lead, as Hamlin passed Martin for 15th. With seven laps remaining, Edwards had a 1.67 second lead over Johnson. As Edwards crossed the finish line to win the race, Johnson won his fifth consecutive championship. Harvick finished third, ahead of Almirola and Allmendinger in fourth and fifth. Kahne, Newman, Stewart, Kenseth and Biffle rounded out the top ten finishers in the race.

Post-race 

Race winner Carl Edwards appeared in victory lane after his victory lap. He celebrated his second consecutive win, in front of a crowd of 67,000 people. After winning the race, he said "Why didn't you set the cars up like this before, Bob [Osbourne]? That was the best performance down the straightaway I've had in a long time."

Afterward, Johnson began celebrating his fifth consecutive Sprint Cup Series championship. During the celebration, Johnson's crew chief, Chad Knaus commented, "I think finally, finally after pulling this off Jimmie will get the respect that he deserves. Knowing what we had to do — come down here and beat them — and we beat them." Hamlin, the points leader before the race, described his disappointment by saying, "I’m disappointed. Our car was lightning fast until that last wreck. When we hit the 16 (Biffle) that knocked the toe-in out. It wasn’t as fast after that. It’s just circumstances but we had a great year. We won the most races (8) and we contended like we have never contended before but circumstances took us out of this one. I don’t think the 48 (Johnson) showed the strength this year like they did in the past and that opened the door for the rest of us." Harvick, who finished third in points, stated:

During the post-race press conference, Harvick and Busch commented on their accident during the race. "Harvick pulled a slide job on my earlier in the day, I crossed over and passed him clean. My guys worked way too hard to be in this position to have a wrecked race car at the end of the year. It means so much to me to finish the year strong. I talked to him in the driver’s meeting but Kevin is such a two-faced guy it doesn’t really matter," Busch said. Afterward, Harvick said "Kyle raced me like a clown all day."

In the Drivers' Championship, Johnson finished first with 6,622 points, 39 ahead of Hamlin in second. Harvick followed in third with 6,581 points. Edwards and Kenseth rounded out the first five positions with 6,393 and 6,294. In the Manufacturers' Championship, Chevrolet won with 261 points, 44 ahead of Toyota and 85 ahead of Ford. Dodge finished fourth with 138 points. 5.605 million people watched the race on television. The race took three hours, nine minutes and fifty seconds to complete, and the margin of victory was 1.608 seconds.

Results

Qualifying

Race results

Standings after the race 

Note: Only the top twelve positions are included for the driver standings. Those drivers qualified for the Chase for the Sprint Cup.

References 

Ford 400
Ford 400
NASCAR races at Homestead-Miami Speedway
November 2010 sports events in the United States